Adlam is an English patronymic surname derived from the Old German given name Adalhelm, meaning "noble protector" or "noble helmet".  It appears not to be derived from the Anglo-Saxon cognate, Æðelhelm, which took different forms in later years, but instead to have come from continental Europe with Norman French.  As a given name, "Adelelmus" appears in the 1086 Domesday Book for Kent, and patronymic forms occur in 12th century England, such as Walterus filius Adelam and Robertus Adelelmus. Variants of the surname include Adlem, Odlam and Adlum.

In England, the name Adlam is most common in Wiltshire.  An Adlam family were significant landowners in Somerset and Wiltshire, particularly in Chew Magna and Meare, and as owners of the manor of Chew Magna and Manor Farmhouse, Meare.

The name may refer to:

 Adrian Adlam (born 1963), British musician
 Alanzo Adlam (born 1989), Jamaican football player
 Leslie Adlam (1897–1975), British football player
 Samuel Adlam Bayntun (1804–1833), British soldier and member of House of Commons 1830–1833
 Tom Adlam (1893–1975), British soldier
 Warwick Adlam (b. 1971), Australian cricketer

See also 
 Adlam alphabet
 George Adlam & Sons, British engineering company

References 

English-language surnames